Aimée Laurentine Kanyana is a magistrate and politician in Burundi.

She was appointed Minister of Justice and Keeper of Seal in August 2015 and was previously the vice-president of the Bank of the Republic of Burundi (BRB).

She was appointed of the magistrate of the Constitutional Court of Burundi in 2013. and is one of several justices who authorized President of Burundi Pierre Nkurunziza to run for a third presidential term against article 96 of Burundian constitution (enacted in 2005) which limits the term of president to two. This third term approval for Nkurunziza  sparked the Burundian unrest (2015–2018).

See also
 Judiciary of Burundi
 Supreme Court of Burundi

References 

Living people
Burundian judges
Burundian politicians
Burundian women in politics
Government ministers of Burundi
Women government ministers of Burundi
Justice ministers
Year of birth missing (living people)